HD 142022 Ab is an exoplanet discovered by the radial velocity method by Eggenberger et al. in 2005 after finding that HD 142022 A is wobbling which indicated the presence of a massive planet, designating as HD 142022 Ab, with mass of 4.5 times Jupiter. It has a relatively wide separation between a planet and a star with nearly 3 AU, which takes 1928 days or 5.28 years to revolve. As it is typical for long-period planets, it has a relatively high eccentricity of 53±20%.

See also 
 HD 141937 b
 HD 142415 b

References

External links 
 

Exoplanets discovered in 2005
Giant planets
Octans
Exoplanets detected by radial velocity